Codner may refer to:

People with the surname
John Codner (1913-2008), British painter.
Maurice Codner (1888-1958), British painter.
Michael Codner (1920-1952), British soldier.
Robert Codner (born 1964), English football player.

See also
 Codner, Alberta